André Gomes Magalhães de Almeida (born 10 September 1990) is a Portuguese professional footballer who last played for Benfica mainly as a right-back but also as a midfielder. He earned 8 caps for the Portugal national team from 2013 to 2015.

Club career

Belenenses
After playing for three other youth clubs in his hometown of Lisbon, Almeida finished his formation with Belenenses. He made his top division debut on 11 January 2009 by playing one minute in a 0–1 loss against Rio Ave, and finished his first full season with 20 games and one goal as the club suffered relegation.

Almeida appeared in 18 matches in the 2010–11 campaign and scored twice, but Belenenses could only rank in 13th position in the second level.

Benfica

Almeida signed for S.L. Benfica in the 2011 summer, being immediately loaned to fellow top flight side U.D. Leiria. In December, however, he was recalled by the parent club, going on to make four official appearances for the first team until the end of the season, including 90 minutes in a 2–0 home win over C.D. Santa Clara for the domestic league cup, which Benfica won for the fourth time in a row.

Almeida started 2012–13 with Benfica B in division two. However, following the sales of Javi García and Axel Witsel in the last minutes of the summer transfer window, he started being called regularly to the main squad, either as a backup to Maxi Pereira at right back or in centre midfield.

Almeida made his UEFA Champions League debut on 19 September 2012 in a 0–0 draw at Celtic. He also played the full 90 minutes in the second group stage game between the two teams, a 2–1 home success; on both occasions, he starred in the right side of defense. On 18 January 2017, Almeida scored his first goal for Benfica in a 6–2 home win over Leixões in the Taça de Portugal quarter-finals.

After the departure of Jardel in June 2021, Almeida became the team's captain, with Nicolás Otamendi taking his place in the 2022–23 season.

International career
Almeida gained 30 caps for Portugal all youth categories comprised, including 17 for the under-21 team. He made his debut with the full side on 11 October 2013, playing the full 90 minutes as a right back in a 1–1 home draw against Israel for the 2014 FIFA World Cup qualifiers.

On 19 May 2014, Almeida was named by manager Paulo Bento in the final 23-man squad for the tournament in Brazil. He made his debut in the competition on 16 June, replacing injured Fábio Coentrão in the second half of an eventual 0–4 group stage loss to Germany.

Career statistics

Club

International

Honours
Benfica
Primeira Liga: 2013–14, 2014–15, 2015–16, 2016–17, 2018–19
Taça de Portugal: 2013–14, 2016–17
Taça da Liga: 2011–12, 2013–14, 2014–15, 2015–16
Supertaça Cândido de Oliveira: 2014, 2016, 2017
UEFA Europa League runner-up: 2012–13, 2013–14

References

External links

 
 
 

1990 births
Living people
Footballers from Lisbon
Portuguese footballers
Association football defenders
Association football midfielders
Association football utility players
Primeira Liga players
Liga Portugal 2 players
C.F. Os Belenenses players
S.L. Benfica footballers
U.D. Leiria players
S.L. Benfica B players
Portugal youth international footballers
Portugal under-21 international footballers
Portugal international footballers
2014 FIFA World Cup players